The 1963 European Rowing Championships for men were rowing championships held on Lake Bagsværd near the Danish capital Copenhagen; the competition for women was held the following month in Moscow. The regatta in Copenhagen was held from 14 to 18 August.

German participation
The rowing federations of East and West Germany met at the end of July in Hanover to discuss how their rowers should be represented. FISA did not recognise East Germany as a country and insisted on one German team per boat class. The negotiations were overshadowed by political tension—the Berlin Wall had been built two years earlier—and did not result in an agreement. The decision was thus made by FISA that selection trials for men were to be held at the Olympic regatta course in Grünau in East Berlin on 9 August. The West German rowers won the races in all seven boat classes. The closest result was the photo finish of the coxless pair, where the West German team was 0.05 seconds ahead.

At a FISA meeting held in conjunction with the 1963 regatta, the East German rowing association asked for separate German teams to be allowed to compete in future. The vote on the item was 37 against and 15 in favour of the proposal, and the motion was thus rejected.

Medal summary – men's events
The finals were held during heavy rain. In the single sculls, the inaugural world champion, Vyacheslav Ivanov, came fourth. Medallists at the 1963 European Rowing Championships for men were:

Medals table

References

European Rowing Championships
European Rowing Championships
International sports competitions in Copenhagen
Rowing
Rowing